The 1971 Virginia Slims National Indoors, also known as the Virginia Slims of Boston,  was a women's tennis tournament played on indoor carpet courts at the Winchester Indoor Tennis Center in Winchester, Massachusetts in the United States that was part of the 1971 Virginia Slims World Championship Series. It was the 64th edition of the tournament and was held from February 26 through March 1, 1971. First-seeded Billie Jean King won the singles title after a win in the final against Rosie Casals and earned $2,500 first-prize money.

Finals

Singles
 Billie Jean King defeated  Rosie Casals 4–6, 6–2, 6–3

Doubles
 Rosie Casals /  Billie Jean King defeated  Françoise Dürr /  Ann Jones 6–4, 7–5

References

Virginia Slims National Indoors
Virginia Slims of Boston
1973 Virginia Slims National Indoors 
Virginia Slims National Indoors
Virginia Slims National Indoors
Virginia Slims National Indoors
Virginia Slims National Indoors
Winchester, Massachusetts
History of Middlesex County, Massachusetts
Sports in Middlesex County, Massachusetts
Tourist attractions in Middlesex County, Massachusetts